Charlotte Independence Soccer Club, sometimes referred to as Charlotte Independence II, is a soccer club from Rock Hill, South Carolina that competes in the Deep South Division of USL League Two. They are the affiliate of USL League One club Charlotte Independence. Despite the similar name and using the same logo, they are a separately owned and operated club from the professional team, instead merely affiliated with them.

The club was formed following the merger of Discoveries SC, Carolina Rapids, and Lake Norman SC to form the Charlotte Independence Soccer Club which will serve as the affiliate club for the Charlotte Independence of the USL League One. They will take the league spot that Discoveries previously occupied. They were set to begin play in the 2020 USL League Two season, however, the season was canceled due to the COVID-19 pandemic.

Year-by-year

References

USL League Two teams
Soccer clubs in South Carolina
2019 establishments in South Carolina
Association football clubs established in 2019
Rock Hill, South Carolina